The Bible of Souvigny was written at the end of the 12th century in France. There is a facsimile of the Bible of Souvigny in the city of the same name in Auvergne. It is filled with manuscript illuminations and was produced at the Cluny Abbey . It is a chief of work of art from the French Middle Ages and is preserved at the bibliothèque des Moulins. The Bible of Souvigny was saved from confiscation during the French Revolution.

External links
 la Bible de Souvigny
 Petite histoire et numérisation
 Illuminations of the Bible of Souvigny (art of the Cluny Abbey):
 Abraham
Scenes of the Creation  (Création du monde)

Illuminated biblical manuscripts